Groeneveld ("green field" in the Dutch language) may refer to:
 Groeneveld, Netherlands, a former municipality
 Groeneveld (elm hybrid)
 Groeneveld (estate), a former Dutch colonial estate in Jakarta.
 Groeneveld (surname)
 1674 Groeneveld, an asteroid, named after Ingrid Groeneveld
 , a castle in Baarn, Utrecht, Netherlands